Sodium aluminium hexafluoride is an inorganic compound with formula Na3AlF6. This white solid, discovered in 1799 by Peder Christian Abildgaard (1740–1801), occurs naturally as the mineral cryolite and is used extensively in the industrial production of aluminium metal. The compound is the sodium (Na+) salt of the hexafluoroaluminate (AlF63−) ion.

Production
Most cryolite is manufactured by a variety of related pathways. One route entails combining sodium aluminate and hydrofluoric acid:
Na3Al(OH)6  +  6 HF   →   Na3AlF6  +  6 H2O

Other routes include:

Often the hexafluorosilicic acid, which is recovered from phosphate mining, is the precursor in a two-step process beginning with neutralization with ammonia to give ammonium hexafluorosilicate:
H3AlF6  +  3NH3   →   (NH4)3AlF6
(NH4)3AlF6  +  3NaOH   →   Na3AlF6  +  3NH3 +  3H2O

The mineral form of sodium hexafluoroaluminate, which is called cryolite, was mined at Ivigtût on the west coast of Greenland until the deposit was depleted in 1987.

Use
The dominant application of synthetic cryolite is as a solvent (or flux) for electrolysis of aluminium oxides such as bauxite. The conversion of aluminium oxides into metallic aluminium requires that the metal ions be dissolved so that they can accept the electrons provided in the electrolysis cell.  A mixture of cryolite and some aluminium trifluoride is used as that solvent.  Unlike typical solutions, this one requires temperatures approaching 1000 °C to melt. Other uses include a whitener for enamels and an opacifier for glass.

Structure
It adopts a perovskite-like structure.  The  centers are nearly idealized octahedra.  Na+ occupy both six- and distorted 8-coordinate sites.

Safety
The  is 600 mg/kg for the comparable compound aluminium trifluoride. Cryolite is poorly soluble in water.

Related compounds
Chiolite, another sodium fluoroaluminate.

References

External links
Chemical Land 21
ESPI Metals
CDC - NIOSH Pocket Guide to Chemical Hazards

Aluminium complexes
Fluoro complexes
Sodium compounds
Fluorometallates